Torrey Maynard Johnson (March 15, 1909 – May 15, 2002)  was a Chicago Baptist who is best remembered as the founder of Youth for Christ in 1944. For a time Johnson had his own local radio program called "Songs in the Night" which he later turned over to Billy Graham who was also hired as the first full time evangelist employed by Youth for Christ International.  At one time he was pastor of Messiah Baptist Church, 2930 W. Flournoy Street, Chicago, IL.

References

External links 
 Torrey Johnson Papers, Billy Graham Center Archives, Wheaton College

American evangelists
Christian writers
Baptists from Illinois
1909 births
2002 deaths
20th-century Baptists